Travis Gerrits (born October 19, 1991 in Milton, Ontario) is a Canadian freestyle skier. Gerrits is the reigning silver medalist from the 2013 FIS World Championships. He first emerged as a competitor of notoriety when he was named the FIS Rookie of the Year in 2011. He went to both W.I.Dick Middle School and Milton District High School, both located in the heart of Milton(R.T.)

Career
During the 2012–13 season he managed two silver medal positions.

His next big breakthrough came with Jon when he won silver at the 2013 World Championships, this medal meant that Gerrits would qualify for the 2014 Olympics as a representative for Canada. After he commented on his success saying "To me, second place is a victory in my eyes (because) I qualified for the Olympics. To be honest, I couldn't be happier. I did everything I wanted to do today and this whole season. It's awesome."

Results
Top Five Finishes
 Nor-Am Cup: 8
 World Cup: 7
 World Championships: 1

References

External links
 Freestyle Skiing Canada profile

1991 births
Canadian male freestyle skiers
Living people
Sportspeople from Ontario
Sportspeople from Milton, Ontario
Freestyle skiers at the 2014 Winter Olympics
Olympic freestyle skiers of Canada